William Blethyn was a prebendary of York and a bishop of Llandaff. He died in 1591.

Life
Blethyn was reputed to have been born at Shirenewton Hall, a large country house at Shirenewton in Monmouthshire, although his descendants were also said to have resided at Dinham, in a mansion on the site later occupied by Great Dinham Farm.

He was educated at Oxford, at either New Inn Hall or Broadgates Hall. He took orders, became archdeacon of Brecon in 1567 and also bishop of Llandaff in 1575, holding several livings at the same time in order to boost the scanty endowments of the see.  Blethyn made efforts to maintain the fabric of his cathedral.

He died in October 1590, leaving three sons, and was buried in the church of Mathern.

References

Attribution

Glyn Simon: Enthronement Sermon September 1957 (Friends of Llandaff Cathedral Report 1958)

1591 deaths
Bishops of Llandaff
16th-century English bishops
16th-century births
Year of birth missing
Archdeacons of Brecon